The Lee Hotel is a “haunted” historic hotel in Yuma, Arizona. It is a two-story building, with 30 hotel rooms, completed in 1917. It was opened by Mary Darcy, who named it for Confederate General Robert E. Lee. It was designed in the Spanish Colonial Revival architectural style. It has been listed on the National Register of Historic Places since April 12, 1984.

References

Buildings and structures in Yuma, Arizona
Hotel buildings completed in 1917
National Register of Historic Places in Yuma County, Arizona
Spanish Colonial Revival architecture in Arizona